Kiessee Dreenkrögen is a lake in the Ludwigslust-Parchim district in Mecklenburg-Vorpommern, Germany.

Lakes of Mecklenburg-Western Pomerania